A Step into the Darkness may refer to:
 A Step into the Darkness (2009 film)
 A Step into the Darkness (1938 film)